Patrick McDonough may refer to:

 Pat McDonough (born 1943), Republican member of the Maryland House of Delegates
 Patrick McDonough (cyclist) (born 1961), retired track cyclist from the United States
 Patrick F. McDonough (died 2001), American police officer, attorney, and member of the Boston City Council
 Patrick J. McDonough (1911–1980), American politician in Massachusetts